John Skeffington may refer to:
 John Skeffington, 14th Viscount Massereene (born 1940), British peer
 Sir John Skeffington, 2nd Baronet (c. 1590–1651), English landowner and politician
 John Skeffington, 10th Viscount Massereene (1812–1863), Irish peer and poet